Birmingham West was a parliamentary constituency represented in the House of Commons of the Parliament of the United Kingdom. It returned one Member of Parliament (MP), elected by the first-past-the-post voting system.

It was created upon the abolition of the 3-seat Birmingham constituency in 1885 and abolished in 1950.

Boundaries 
Before 1885 the city of Birmingham had been a three-member constituency (see Birmingham (UK Parliament constituency) for further details). Under the Redistribution of Seats Act 1885 the parliamentary borough of Birmingham was split into seven single-member divisions, one of which was Birmingham West. It consisted of All Saints' and St Paul's wards and part of Rotton Park ward.

In the 1918 redistribution of parliamentary seats, the Representation of the People Act 1918 provided for twelve Birmingham divisions - one of which was designated as the Birmingham West constituency. In 1945 one of the other Birmingham seats was split in two, as it had over 100,000 electors, but that change did not affect the other divisions. The Birmingham West constituency in 1918 consisted of the County Borough of Birmingham ward of St Paul's and parts of All Saints' and Lozells wards.

In the redistribution which took effect in the 1950 United Kingdom general election, the Representation of the People Act 1948 redivided Birmingham into thirteen constituencies. The West division was abolished. St Paul's and Lozells wards became part of Birmingham Aston. All Saints' ward became part of Birmingham Ladywood.

Members of Parliament

Election results

Elections in the 1880s

Chamberlain was appointed President of the Local Government Board, requiring a by-election.

Elections in the 1890s

Elections in the 1900s

Elections in the 1910s

Elections in the 1920s

Elections in the 1930s

Elections 1940s

See also 
List of former United Kingdom Parliament constituencies

References

 Boundaries of Parliamentary Constituencies 1885-1972, compiled and edited by F.W.S. Craig (Parliamentary Reference Publications 1972)

Constituencies of the Parliament of the United Kingdom established in 1885
Constituencies of the Parliament of the United Kingdom disestablished in 1950
Parliamentary constituencies in Birmingham, West Midlands (historic)